Mainland Regional High School is a regional public high school and school district serving students in grades nine through twelve from the communities of Linwood, Northfield and Somers Point in Atlantic County, New Jersey, United States, serving a total population of over 25,000 in the three communities. The high school is located in Linwood. Mainland Regional High School has been recognized by the National Blue Ribbon Schools Program, the highest honor that an American school can achieve.

As of the 2021–22 school year, the school had an enrollment of 1,213 students and 109.0 classroom teachers (on an FTE basis), for a student–teacher ratio of 11.1:1. There were 102 students (8.4% of enrollment) eligible for free lunch and 9 (0.7% of students) eligible for reduced-cost lunch.

The school is fully accredited by the New Jersey Department of Education.

The district is classified by the New Jersey Department of Education as being in District Factor Group "DE", the fifth-highest of eight groupings. District Factor Groups organize districts statewide to allow comparison by common socioeconomic characteristics of the local districts. From lowest socioeconomic status to highest, the categories are A, B, CD, DE, FG, GH, I and J.

History
In December 1958, a plan for a $2.1 million (equivalent to $ million in ) school building was cut to $1.5 million after a review of the proposal by a pair of state agencies.

In September 1959, the three constituent districts were notified by the Ocean City School District that overcrowding would mean that it would no longer be able to continue accepting students from the communities at Ocean City High School starting in the 1959-60 school year.

The school opened for the 1961-62 school year, with rising seniors from Linwood and Somers Point given the option to complete their schooling at Ocean City High School and those from Northfield to finish up at Pleasantville High School.

Awards, recognition and rankings
For the 1997-98 school year, Mainland Regional High School was formally designated by the United States Department of Education as a National Blue Ribbon School.

In the 2011 "Ranking America's High Schools" issue by The Washington Post, the school was ranked 26th in New Jersey and 910th nationwide. In Newsweek's May 22, 2007 issue, ranking the country's top high schools, Mainland Regional High School was listed in 719th place, the 14th-highest ranked school in New Jersey. The school ranked as number 310 in Newsweek magazine's 2005 listing of "America's Best High Schools". The Washington Post writer Jay Mathews ranked Mainland sixth in New Jersey and 111th in the nation in his book, Class Struggles: What's Wrong (and Right) with America's Best Public High Schools, based on the school's efforts at exposing students to challenging course work. In New Jersey Monthly'''s September 2002 issue, Mainland was ranked fifth among high schools in South Jersey.

The school was the 95th-ranked public high school in New Jersey out of 339 schools statewide in New Jersey Monthly magazine's September 2014 cover story on the state's "Top Public High Schools", using a new ranking methodology. The school had been ranked 81st in the state of 328 schools in 2012, after being ranked 139th in 2010 out of 322 schools listed. The magazine ranked the school 116th in 2008 out of 316 schools. The school was ranked 104th in the magazine's September 2006 issue, which surveyed 316 schools across the state. Schooldigger.com ranked the school 111th out of 381 public high schools statewide in its 2011 rankings (an increase of 47 positions from the 2010 ranking) which were based on the combined percentage of students classified as proficient or above proficient on the mathematics (86.1%) and language arts literacy (96.0%) components of the High School Proficiency Assessment (HSPA).

Athletics
The Mainland Regional High School Mustangs compete in the American Division of the Cape-Atlantic League, an athletic conference comprised of public and private high schools in Atlantic, Cape May, Cumberland and Gloucester counties, operating under the aegis of the New Jersey State Interscholastic Athletic Association (NJSIAA). With 936 students in grades 10-12, the school was classified by the NJSIAA for the 2019–20 school year as Group III for most athletic competition purposes, which included schools with an enrollment of 761 to 1,058 students in that grade range. The football team competes in the Independence Division of the 95-team West Jersey Football League superconferenceMinnick, Kevin. "Football: Entering 10th season, a new leader for state’s second-largest conference", NJ Advance Media for NJ.com, August 8, 2019. Accessed September 5, 2020. "The WJFL was created in 2010 as a way to help teams play a full schedule and face opponents of similar size, ability and geographical location.... The league is comprised of 16 divisions and includes better than 90 high schools." and was classified by the NJSIAA as Group IV South for football for 2018–2020.

The field hockey team won the South II sectional championship in 1973 and won both the South Jersey Group III sectional title and the overall Group III state championship in 1975. The 1973 team won the Group III title against West Essex High School on a tiebreaker following a 0-0 tie after regulation in the championship game.

The football team won the South Jersey Group III state sectional title in 1980, 1996, 1997 and 2002, and won the South Jersey Group IV title in 2008. The 1980 team scored two touchdowns in the span of 76 seconds to stage a comeback and win the South Jersey Group III state sectional championship by a score of 12-7 against an Overbrook High School team that had come into the finals undefeated. In 1996, the team won the South Jersey Group III title with a 14-7 win in the championship game against Pennsauken High School at The College of New Jersey. The team won the 2002 South Jersey Group III state championship, defeating Delsea Regional High School 21-7 in the final. In 2008, the football team won their first South Jersey Group IV sectional championship with a 21-14 win against Southern Regional High School, going 12-0 for the first time. The football team had won the 1995 South Jersey Group III title with a 42-14 victory over top-seeded Woodrow Wilson High School, but the title was later vacated by the NJSIAA due to the use of an ineligible player who had played despite being suspended.via Associated Press. "Mainland stripped of title", Asbury Park Press, March 14, 1996. Accessed February 6, 2021, via Newspapers.com. "Mainland Regional, which won the New Jersey State Interscholastic Athletic Association South Jersey Group III football state championship 42-14 over Woodrow Wilson on Dec. 9, has been stripped of its title for using an ineligible player.... Under state rules, a player ejected from a game must serve a one-game suspension.... On Feb. 22, state Education Commissioner Leo Klagholz upheld the suspension rule."

The boys' basketball team won the 1981 Group III state championship, defeating Randolph High School by a score of 61-47 in the title game.Mills, Ed. "Big Victory Carries Randolph To Top", Daily Record, March 29, 1981. Accessed December 26, 2020, via Newspapers.com. "The Rams bowed to Mainland 61- 47 in the Group III championship game, thus losing their opportunity to become only the second Morris County team ever to win a state group title in basketball."
 
The boys track team won the indoor track state championship in Group III in 1996.

The boys track team won the Group III state indoor relay championship in 1996.

The boys tennis team won the Group III state championship in 1997, winning the tournament's final against Princeton High School.

The boys cross country running team won the Group III state championship in 2001 and 2002, and won the Group IV title in 2003. The team won the Meet of Champions in 2002 and 2003. The two MoC titles are tied for fifth-most of any school in the state. In 2003, the team made history when fifth man Alex Palmentieri crossed the finish line to clinch the team's second consecutive Meet of Champions title. The team's average time of 16:19, was a second off of the record set by Christian Brothers Academy in 1982 for the state championship course in Holmdel Township, New Jersey.

In 2002, the golf team won the state championship, giving them the #1 ranking in the state for the 2003 season. In 2010, Mainland's Kylie Strijek won the girls' state Tournament of Champions.

The boys' swimming team has won the Public B state championship in 2003 and 2016-2019. In 2003, the boys' swim team won Mainland's first ever swimming state championship by beating Princeton High School 91-79 in the Public B state final. The boys' swimming team finished the season with a 15-0 record and won its second Public B title in 2016, with a 99-71 win against Scotch Plains-Fanwood High School in the tournament final The team won its second consecutive title in 2017 with a 103-67 victory over Soctch Plains-Fanwood.

In 2007, the girls' soccer team won the Cape-Atlantic League American Conference for the first time in Mainland's history. A 1-0 win over Oakcrest High School guaranteed that Mainland would take the Cape-Atlantic League American Conference title in 2009.

In 2018, the boys' lacrosse team won their first Cape-Atlantic League Championship in Mainland's history, beating Ocean City 7-6.

In 2007, the boys' rowing team won the state championship with the Varsity and Second Varsity Eight.

In 2008, the JV girls rowing team, won the National Championships.

The girls tennis team won the Group III state championship in 1990, defeating Ramapo High School by 4-1 in the tournament final."Ramapo finishes 2nd in Group III tournament", The Record, October 25, 1990. Accessed January 18, 2021, via Newspapers.com. "Bergen County schools had a rough day at the New Jersey State Interscholastic Athletic Association State semifinals Wednesday at Mercer County Park. Only Group 3 sectional champion Ramapo managed to reach the State group finals, where the Green Raiders fell to Mainland, 4-1." In 2015, the team won the South Jersey Group II title with a 4-1 win in the tournament final against Seneca High School.

The baseball team were 2014 South Jersey Group III champions and won the Group III state championship with a 5-3 win in the tournament final against Mount Olive High School.O'Kane, John. "Mainland Regional baseball team wins state Group III title; Joins Buena Regional as local state champions", The Press of Atlantic City, June 7, 2014. Accessed May 12, 2015. "Four school buses full of fans turned the return trip down the Garden State Parkway into a victory parade for the Mainland Regional High School baseball team on Saturday. The 'Corral Crazies' had plenty of reasons to cheer as the Mustangs had just won the biggest game in school history, beating Mount Olive 5-3 to win the state Group III championship."

The girls' basketball team won the Group III state championship in 2019 with a 42-35 win against runner-up Chatham High School in the finals of the tournament at the RWJBarnabas Health Arena.Deakyne, Brian. "Complete team effort sends Mainland to 1st girls basketball state title", NJ Advance Media for NJ.com, March 10, 2019, updated August 22, 2019. Accessed January 17, 2021. "That 3-pointer from Hafetz gave Mainland the lead for good en route to a 42-35 win over Chatham in the Group 3 final Sunday afternoon at RWJ Barnabas Health Arena in Toms River. It was the end-goal for a historic team that captured the program's first-ever state championship and will play in the Tournament of Champions for the first time next week." The team advanced to the Tournament of Champions as the sixth seed, falling to Manchester Township High School by a score of 74-44 in the quarterfinal round, to finish the season with a 28-4 record.McGarry, Mike. "Mainland's girls basketball season ends in Tournament of Champions", The Press of Atlantic City, March 13, 2019. Accessed January 17, 2021. "Manchester sank five 3-pointers in the first quarter and beat Mainland 74-44 in a Tournament of Champions quarterfinal at RWJBarnabas Health Arena.... To stay competitive, sixth-seeded Mainland (28-4) needed to control the tempo and hope Manchester shot poorly from the perimeter."

Marching band
The school's marching band was Tournament of Bands Chapter One Champions in 1979 (Group 2), 1980 and 1984 (Group 3) and 1989 (Group 1). The marching band also won the USSBA New Jersey state championship in 2005 and 2006, and were Northern All-State Group 1A Champions in 2008. The Mainland Regional Marching Band's color guard won Best Color Guard at US Bands National Championship for group 2A in 2012. The Marching band won chapter 1 South Jersey and New Jersey state championships for group 1A in 2014. The marching band won states and regionals in 2015 and were awarded 3rd in the Atlantic Coast Championships in group 2A.

The band currently competes in Tournament of Bands Group 2A under the direction of Jon Ratcliffe, who took over as Director in 2018. In 2019, the marching band won both State Championships and Region 1 South Jersey Championships for Group 2A. The Mainland Marching Band also won Atlantic Coast Championships for the first time in circuit history and received the highest score in Mainland Regional history with a score of 95.54 while winning captions for Best Music and Best Visual. Having scored higher than a 92 in A class, the band was announced to be promoted to Open Class for competition in the 2020 season.

Mock trial and drama
Mainland's mock trial team won the Vincent J. Apruzzese Mock Trial Competition covering the whole state of New Jersey in 2003 and went on to compete in the National High School Mock Trial Championship in New Orleans. On March 31, 2009, the Mainland "mockers" won the state championship in New Brunswick, New Jersey. They went undefeated (11-0) to get there, after winning county and regional tournaments and went on to participate in the American Mock Trial Invitational.

In 2019, the school won the Looby Cup for the eighth consecutive time, the state title of the New Jersey Drama and Forensic League, which includes competitions in various aspects of theater and speech. Not only did Mainland come home again with the Looby Cup and first place, several members of the team garnered state champion status in their categories.

Controversy and incidents

2006 graduation controversy
In Mainland Regional High School's graduation of 2006, valedictorian Kareem Elnahal gave an unauthorized speech instead of the approved one. In his speech he criticized Mainland saying "the education we have received here is not only incomplete, it is entirely hollow." After delivering his speech, Elnahal received an ovation from some of the students in the audience. Kareem then left the graduation ceremonies before receiving his diploma.Applause (and some boos) for graduation speaker , The Press of Atlantic City, June 25, 2006.

2008 graduation controversy
During the 2008 graduation ceremony, Salutatorian Jennifer Chau's speech was cut off, after she strayed from her approved text and issued a criticism of the school's administration. Students and parents in the audience protested the cut off, requesting that she be allowed to finish her remarks. Chau's issue revolved around a decision by the school board to not let her receive credit for a freshman honors class, which allowed another student (Rebecca Ojserkis), the child of one of the Board of Education members (Janice Colton Ojserkis), to be chosen as valedictorian.<ref>"NJ Salutatorian has critical speech cut off" , The Press of Atlantic City, June 20, 2008. Accessed June 20, 2008.</ref>

October 2006 bomb threats
Mainland experienced several bomb threats during the beginning of the 2006–2007 school year. A series of four written threats in a five-school day time span were left by students throughout the school. After several school lockdowns, evacuations, and the installation of cameras with government funding throughout the school, it seems the problem has been resolved. Two girls held responsible were placed on probation and face fines of up to $11,000 to cover costs incurred by police departments from Linwood, Somers Point, Northfield, The State Police, Prosecutors Office, Atlantic City Bomb Squad, Egg Harbor Township K-9 units and Cape May County, who responded to the incidents. This includes the Atlantic County Emergency Response Units' vehicle. The two girls also must provide hours of community service and various other forms of restitution. School officials have implied that the students arrested will be prosecuted to the fullest extent of the law. Five Mainland students were arrested for making bomb threats and also two Mainland students are arrested for causing a fire in the girls' bathroom.

Death of four football players in 2011
In August 2011, four players from the school's football team were killed in a crash on the Garden State Parkway on their way to an annual team breakfast lost control, when the SUV they were driving in overturned and crashed.

2013 chemical spill
In May 2013, incorrectly mixed pool chemicals caused chlorine vapors to spread through the school's hallways. The school was promptly evacuated and 30 students and staff were treated at area hospitals for symptoms related to exposure to the fumes. School sessions resumed after the weekend once the chemical fumes had been vented successfully.

Administration
Core members of the district's / school's administration are:
Mark Marrone, Superintendent / Principal
Kim Robinson, Business Administrator / Board Secretary
Kevin Burns, Principal

Board of education
The district's board of education, comprised of nine members, sets policy and oversees the fiscal and educational operation of the district through its administration. As a Type II school district, the board's trustees are elected directly by voters to serve three-year terms of office on a staggered basis, with three seats up for election each year held (since 2012) as part of the November general election. The board appoints a superintendent to oversee the district's day-to-day operations and a business administrator to supervise the business functions of the district. Seats on the board of education are allocated based on population, with four seats assigned to Somers Point, three to Northfield and two to Linwood.

Notable alumni

 James F. Allen (born c. 1960), chairman of Hard Rock International and chief executive officer of Seminole Gaming.
 Matt Broomall (born 1994), soccer player who plays as a goalkeeper for the Richmond Kickers in USL League One.
 Greg Buttle (born 1954), former NFL linebacker for the New York Jets who was a four-sport letterman in football, basketball, baseball and track and field at Mainland.
 Joshua Cohen (born 1980), novelist and story writer, best known for his works Witz (2010) and Book of Numbers (2015).
 Shereef Elnahal (born 1985, class of 2003), physician who has served as 21st Commissioner of the New Jersey Department of Health.
 Rachel Alana Handler (born 1988), actress, singer and motivational speaker who is best known for playing Chunks in the 2016 horror movie Smothered.
 Kenneth Lacovara (born 1961, class of 1979), paleontologist best known for his discovery of Dreadnoughtus.
 Samuel Ojserkis (born 1990), rower who competed in the men's eight event at the 2016 Summer Olympics.
 Osun Osunniyi (born 1998), college basketball player for the St. Bonaventure Bonnies of the Atlantic 10 Conference
 Jennifer Pershing (born 1980 as Jennifer Ackley, class of 1998), Miss March 2009 in Playboy magazine.
 Chase Petty, baseball pitcher who was selected in the first round of the 2021 Major League Baseball draft by the Minnesota Twins.
 Stephen H. Segal (born 1975), Hugo Award-winning editorial chief of Weird Tales magazine.
 John Stone (born 1979), former NFL wide receiver.
 Tim Watson (born 1974), former NFL defensive tackle.

References

External links
Mainland Regional High School website

School Data for the Mainland Regional High School, National Center for Education Statistics
South Jersey Sports: Mainland HS

1961 establishments in New Jersey
Educational institutions established in 1961
Linwood, New Jersey
Northfield, New Jersey
Somers Point, New Jersey
New Jersey District Factor Group DE
Public high schools in Atlantic County, New Jersey
School districts in Atlantic County, New Jersey